Percy Jackson & the Olympians (also known as Percy Jackson) is a two-film series based on the novel series of the same name by the author Rick Riordan. The series was distributed by 20th Century Fox, produced by 1492 Pictures and consists of two installments. The first film, Percy Jackson & the Olympians: The Lightning Thief (2010), was directed by Chris Columbus and was released on February 12, 2010. The second installment, Percy Jackson: Sea of Monsters, was originally intended to be released in March 2013 but was instead pushed back to August 7, 2013, and was directed by Thor Freudenthal. While the film series was intended to match the five novel book series, and the second film laid the foundation for a third film, further films were never produced. The shortened series in total grossed nearly $430 million at the worldwide box office.

The films follow the adventures of demigod Percy Jackson and his comrades at the demigod training ground of Camp Half-Blood. In the first film, Percy must go on a quest to save his mother from the underworld and prove his innocence when he is accused of stealing lightning from Zeus. The second film revolves around Percy’s escapades as he must retrieve the legendary Golden Fleece from the Sea of Monsters, or the Bermuda triangle, which is the only thing that will save the camp from the forces of darkness.

Films

Percy Jackson & the Olympians: The Lightning Thief (2010)

In June 2004, 20th Century Fox acquired feature film rights to the book. In April 2007, director Chris Columbus was hired to helm the project. Filming began in April 2009 in Vancouver. The film was released on February 12, 2010. It was met with mixed reviews upon release and was a commercial success, grossing almost $227 million at the worldwide box office against a budget of $95 million. The plot revolves around a twelve-year-old Percy Jackson who discovers that he is the son of Poseidon, Greek God of the sea, and goes to Camp Half-Blood, a training camp for demigods, the half mortal children of Greek gods. When Percy's mom is kidnapped by Hades, and Percy is accused of stealing Zeus' lightning bolt, Percy and his friends go on a quest to rescue his mom from the underworld, leading them across America to find Persephone's pearls, while proving that Percy is not the lightning thief and is innocent.

Percy Jackson: Sea of Monsters (2013)

In October 2011, 20th Century Fox announced a sequel based on the second book, The Sea of Monsters. The film was released on August 7, 2013. Percy Jackson, son of Greek god Poseidon, discovers he has a half-brother, Tyson a Cyclops, and embarks on a journey with his friends to retrieve the Golden Fleece to save a magical tree containing the spirit of Zeus's daughter Thalia Grace who died at the gates of Camp Half-Blood while saving Annabeth, Luke and Grover. This tree protects their training ground, Camp Half-Blood and reinforces their borders. They must travel to the Sea of Monsters to save the fleece, and conquer the challenges that may await them. The film grossed just over $202 million at the worldwide box office.

Cast and crew

Cast

 A  indicates the actor portrayed the role of a younger version of the character.
 A dark gray cell indicates the character was not in the film.

</noinclude>{| class="wikitable" style="text-align:center"
! rowspan="2" width="16%" | Character
! colspan="2" align="center" | Film
|-
! align="center" width="12%" | The Lightning Thief(2010) 

! align="center" width="12%" | Sea of Monsters(2013)
|- -
! colspan="3" style="background-color:#ddf;" |

Main characters
|-
! Percy Jackson
| colspan="2"|Logan Lerman
|-
! Annabeth Chase
| Alexandra Daddario
| Alexandra DaddarioAlisha Newton
|-
! Grover Underwood
| Brandon T. Jackson
| Brandon T. JacksonBjorn Yearwood 
|-
!Luke Castellan
| Jake Abel
| Jake AbelSamuel Braun
|-
! Mr. Brunner / Chiron
| colspan="1"|Pierce Brosnan
| colspan="1"| Anthony Head
|-
! Tyson
|colspan="1" style="background-color:lightgrey;" |  
|colspan="1"| Douglas Smith
|-
! colspan="3" style="background-color:#ddf;" |

Gods and Titans
|-
! Zeus
| colspan="1"|Sean Bean
| colspan="1" | Sean Bean (Deleted scene)
|-
! Poseidon
| colspan="1"|Kevin McKidd
| colspan="1" style="background-color:lightgrey;" | (Mentioned only)
|-
! Hades
| colspan="1"|Steve Coogan
| colspan="1" style="background-color:lightgrey;" | (Mentioned only)
|-
! Hera
| Erica Cerra
| colspan="1" style="background-color:lightgrey;" |  
|-
! Athena
| Melina Kanakaredes
| colspan="1" style="background-color:lightgrey;" | (Mentioned only)
|-
! Hermes
| colspan="1"|Dylan Neal
| colspan="1"|Nathan Fillion
|-
! Demeter
| Stefanie von Pfetten
|colspan="1" style="background-color:lightgrey;" |  
|-
! Apollo
| Dimitri Lekkos
| colspan="1" style="background-color:lightgrey;" |  
|-
! Artemis
| Ona Grauer
| colspan="1" style="background-color:lightgrey;" |  
|-
! Mr. D / Dionysus
| colspan="1"|Luke Camilleri
| colspan="1"|Stanley Tucci
|-
! Ares
| colspan="1"|Ray Winstone
| colspan="1" style="background-color:lightgrey;" | (Mentioned only)
|-
! Aphrodite
| Serinda Swan
|colspan="1" style="background-color:lightgrey;" | (Mentioned only)
|-
! Hephaestus
| Conrad Coates
|colspan="1" style="background-color:lightgrey;" |  
|-
! Persephone
| Rosario Dawson
|colspan="1" style="background-color:lightgrey;" |  
|-
! Kronos
| colspan="1" style="background-color:lightgrey;" | (Mentioned only)
| colspan="1"|Robert Knepper
|-
! colspan="3" style="background-color:#ddf;" |

Camp Half-Blood demigods
|-
!Clarisse La Rue
|colspan="1" style="background-color:lightgrey;" |  
| colspan="1"|Leven Rambin
|-
! Chris Rodriguez
| colspan="1" style="background-color:lightgrey;" |  
| colspan="1"|Grey Damon
|-
|}

Crew

Criticism
Rick Riordan, the author of the book series, has mentioned in numerous interviews that he has never seen the movies, to keep them from influencing the way he views the characters. During March 2016, Riordan wrote a letter asking teachers not to show the movie to students during class time. Both movies received criticism for their deviation from the source material, with the second movie being criticized for having merged the plots of both the second and fifth books of the series. In 2018, Riordan wrote a blog post detailing how limited his influence on the production of the films was, while also making public some of the e-mails he sent to the films' producers, in which he expressed concern over the ways they were altering his stories.

Reception

Box office performance

Critical and public response

References

Films directed by Chris Columbus
20th Century Studios franchises
American fantasy adventure films
American teen films
English-language films
Film series based on fantasy novels
Film series based on American novels
Films based on classical mythology
Films set in New York City
Films shot in Tennessee
Films shot in Vancouver
Percy Jackson & the Olympians
2010s fantasy films
1492 Pictures films
Films produced by Karen Rosenfelt
Duologies
2010s English-language films
2010s American films